Antonio Cruz (born 20 April 1952) is a Guatemalan former swimmer. He competed in three events at the 1968 Summer Olympics.

References

1952 births
Living people
Guatemalan male swimmers
Olympic swimmers of Guatemala
Swimmers at the 1968 Summer Olympics
Sportspeople from Guatemala City